Amedeo Preziosi (2 December 1816 – 27 September 1882) was a Maltese painter and traveler known for his watercolours and prints of the Balkans, Ottoman Empire, and Romania.

Biography

Amedeo Preziosi was born in 1816 to a noble family in Malta. His father, Giovanni Francesco Preziosi, had high-level functions in the local administration and represented the Maltese people at the negotiations of the Treaty of Amiens in 1802, while his mother, Margareta née Reynaud, was of French origin. Amedeo, the first child of the Preziosi family, was baptised in the Porto Salvo Church in Valletta and given the name Aloysius-Rosarius-Amadeus-Raymundus-Andreas. His younger brother Leandro Preziosi became one of the pioneers of early photography in Malta.

Amedeo was attracted by the arts from early age and was taught by Giuseppe Hyzler, a very appreciated painter in Malta. While his father wanted Amedeo to study law, sending him to study at the Law School in Sorbonne, Amedeo was more interested in arts and continues his painting studies at the École des Beaux-Arts. After his return home, Amedeo did not find in Malta a suitable environment for an artist, especially since his father disapproved his chosen career. As such, Amedeo chose to leave the island and move to the Near East, an area lauded by the fellow artists in Paris. The year when he left Malta for Istanbul is not known, but is thought to be between 1840 and 1842.

The earliest drawings of Istanbul are dated November 1842. Two years later, in 1844, Preziosi was commissioned by Robert Curzon, the private secretary of the British Ambassador to Istanbul, Lord Stratford Canning, 1st Viscount Stratford de Redcliffe to create an album called Costumes of Constantinople,  which now is located in the collections of the British Museum.

In an era when postal cards were still at their beginning and so was the photographic art, Preziosi offered the European tourists and visitors of Istanbul drawings of the city and the surroundings. In 1858, he decided to publish the most popular works as lithographs at the Lemercier workshop in Paris. The chromolithography album, named Stamboul, Recollections of Eastern Life and re-edited in 1861 as Stamboul, Souvenir d'Orient was drawn on the lithography stone by Preziosi himself. He published a second album, Souvenir du Caïre, comprising drawings he made during a trip to Egypt.

Preziosi married a Greek woman of Istanbul, with whom he had four children:  Mathilde, Giulia, Catherine and Roberto, living in Hamalbaşi Sokagi in Pera and later in the quiet village of San Stefano (today Yeşilköy), away from the agitation of the city.

Preziosi was proficient in the languages of the region (Greek and Turkish), as well as major European languages (English, French, Italian) and he worked as deputy of the dragoman of the British Embassy as well as the First Dragoman of the Greek legation.

His workshop was routinely visited by tourists wishing to return home with a souvenir of Istanbul, and among his guests was, in April 1869, Edward VII of the United Kingdom, then the Prince of Wales, who bought several watercolours from him. In 1866, as the new Prince of Romania, Carol I visited Istanbul, he met Preziosi and invited him to Romania to make watercolours of the landscapes and people of the country.

Preziosi came to Romania in June 1868 and began drawing scenes from Bucharest as well as several others across the country, including a few which depict Prince Carol I. The sketches he draw were later turned into watercolours in his workshop in Istanbul, which he would then sell to the Prince of Romania for prices ranging from 300 to 1200 Francs. The following year, between May 30 and July 15, Preziosi spent time again in Romania, his drawings, in pencil, ink and watercolours are found in a sketchbook La Valachie par Preziosi, now found at the Municipal Museum in Bucharest.

After his return from his last trip to Romania, little is known of Preziosi. He continued his art in Istanbul, but as photography became widespread, his watercolours were no longer as profitable, since cheap and unlimited numbers of copies could be made of a particular photograph.

Preziosi was killed by an accidental gun discharge while hunting. He was buried in the Catholic cemetery of Yeşilköy, Istanbul.

Legacy
After his death, his works were forgotten for decades. In Bucharest, his works were presented again to the public in 1934, and in 1985, some of his works were displayed in an exhibition at London's Victoria and Albert Museum dedicated to him and in 2003, an exhibition of his works in Bucharest was organized by the Museum of Bucharest.

Works

See also

List of Orientalist artists
Orientalism

Notes

References
 Adrian-Silvan Ionescu, Preziosi în România, Noi Media Print, 2003, 

1816 births
1882 deaths
19th-century Maltese painters
19th-century travelers
Immigrants to Albania
Immigrants to Romania
Immigrants to the Ottoman Empire
Maltese artists
Maltese emigrants to Egypt
Maltese people of French descent
Orientalist painters
People from Valletta